is an animator.

He directs Domo (Domo-kun) shorts by using stop motion animation; Domo is the mascot of NHK.

He has also directed the stop motion animation film Komaneko - The Curious Cat and the three-minute stop motion music video short "I am a Bear," which is based on the Hikaru Utada song "Boku wa Kuma."

In 2011, Gōda was awarded the Inkpot Award.

References

Living people
Inkpot Award winners
Japanese animators
Japanese animated film directors
Japanese music video directors
Stop motion animators
Year of birth missing (living people)